The yellow-streaked lory (Chalcopsitta scintillata), also known as the streaked lory or yellowish-streaked lory, is a species of parrot in the family Psittaculidae.

Distribution and habitat
It is found in the Aru Islands and southern New Guinea.  Its natural habitats are subtropical or tropical moist lowland forest and subtropical or tropical mangrove forest.

Taxonomy
The yellow-streaked lory species contains three subspecies:

 Chalcopsitta scintillata (Temminck) 1835
 Chalcopsitta scintillata chloroptera Salvadori 1876
 Chalcopsitta scintillata rubrifrons Gray, GR 1858 - Carmine-fronted lory
 Chalcopsitta scintillata scintillata (Temminck) 1835 - Nominate subspecies

References

External links

yellow-streaked lory
Birds of the Aru Islands
Birds of New Guinea
yellow-streaked lory
Taxonomy articles created by Polbot